Chaerodes is a genus of beetles belonging to the family Tenebrionidae.

The species of this genus are found in Australia.

Species:

Chaerodes concolor 
Chaerodes trachyscelides

References

Tenebrionidae